Jorge Dubcovsky is a plant geneticist and biologist at the University of California, Davis. He is an investigator with the Howard Hughes Medical Institute. Dubcovsky's research focuses on wheat genomics. In 2013, he was elected to the National Academy of Sciences. In 2014, Dubcovsky won the Wolf Prize in Agriculture alongside Leif Andersson.

Early life 
Dubcovsky graduated from the University of Buenos Aires in 1984 with a degree in biological sciences. He completed his Ph.D. at the University of Buenos Aires and began studying wheat genetics at the University of California, Davis in 1992. In 2004, research led by Dubcovsky culminated in the identification and cloning of the VRN2 gene in winter wheat.

References 

Wolf Prize in Agriculture laureates
Members of the United States National Academy of Sciences
Year of birth missing (living people)
Living people
Howard Hughes Medical Investigators